Louis Béroud (17 January 1852, Lyon – 9 October 1930, Paris) was a French painter of the late 19th, early 20th century. Some of his paintings are visible at the Musée Carnavalet and The Louvre in Paris. On 22 August 1911 Béroud came to The Louvre to sketch his painting Mona Lisa au Louvre but where the famous La Joconde, by Leonardo da Vinci, should have stood, he found four iron pegs. Béroud contacted the section head of the guards, who thought the painting was being photographed for marketing purposes. A few hours later, Béroud checked back with the section head of the museum, and it was confirmed that the Mona Lisa was not with the photographers. The Louvre was closed for an entire week to aid in investigation of the theft.

Works 
List of some of his works in French national museums:
L'escalier de l'opéra  Garnier (1877), Carnavalet Museum
Le dôme central de la galerie des machines à l'exposition universelle de 1889 (1890), Carnavalet Museum
Salle Rubens au Louvre (1904), Musée du Louvre
À la gloire de Rubens (1905), Musée du Louvre
Au Salon Carré du Louvre (1906), Musée du Louvre
Chambre du Baron Basile de Schlichting (1908), Musée du Louvre
Vue de la Salle des Sept Cheminées au Louvre (1909), Musée du Louvre
L'Avenue de la Gare à Nice, Musée Masséna

Notes

References 
Ronzevalle, Edmond. Paris Xe : histoire, monuments, culture, Amiens : Martelle éditions, 1993. 
Storrie, Calum.The delirious museum : a journey from the Louvre to Las Vegas, London : I. B. Tauris, 2007. , p. 9-15

External links 

19th-century French painters
19th-century French male artists
French male painters
20th-century French painters
20th-century French male artists
1852 births
1930 deaths